Michael Troughton (born 2 March 1955) is an English actor, teacher and writer. He is best known for his television roles including Melish in Minder and Sir Piers Fletcher-Dervish in The New Statesman. He is the son of actor Patrick Troughton and the younger brother of actor David Troughton.

Career
He has appeared in many film, television and theatre roles, most notably as Melish in Minder and Sir Piers Fletcher-Dervish in The New Statesman from 1987 to 1992. Troughton also starred in the first series of Backs to the Land. His more recent roles include senior science master Derek Halliday in the Taggart episode "Out of Bounds", 1998, a therapist in the fourth series of Cold Feet and Mr Mermagen in Enigma.

Troughton took a break from acting in 2002 in order to care for his disabled wife and obtained a science degree, from the Open University. He then taught physics at Sir John Leman school in Beccles for two years, before moving to Woodbridge School to become Head of Drama.

In 2009, he stopped teaching and became a full-time carer. His biography of his father, Patrick Troughton, published by Hirst Publishing, was launched at the 2011 Dimensions Convention in Newcastle in November 2011. In 2013, he returned to acting, appearing in the ITV series Breathless. He has also completed a number of audio dramatisations for Big Finish.

Troughton appeared in the 2014 Doctor Who Christmas Special Last Christmas as Professor Albert.

Troughton is now an approved Amazon ACX audible producer and works on audio books, voiceovers and narrations from his studio in Suffolk.

Personal life
Troughton married Caroline M. Marston in 1981; they had a son, Matthew, and a daughter, Sally. The family moved to Suffolk from London in 1988. Marston developed multiple sclerosis, and died in the summer of 2012.
Troughton remarried in 2019 to Roxana Mohabaty.

Filmography
 Doctor Who – Professor Albert (episode "Last Christmas", 2014)
 Breathless (2013) – Mr Truscott
 Holby City – Teddy Sedgwick ("Change of Heart", 2002)
 Micawber – Milton (3 episodes, 2001–2002)
 Cold Feet – Therapist (2 episodes, 2001)
 My Family – Mr. Henshaw ("Ben Wants to Be a Millionaire", 2001)
 High Stakes – Mike Burchett ("The Challenge", 2001)
 Enigma (2001) – Mr. Mermagen
 Lucy Sullivan Is Getting Married (1999–2000) – Ivor (all episodes)
 Casualty – Chris Thomas ("No More Mr Nice Guy", 2000)
 The Mrs Bradley Mysteries – Inspector Starkey ("Speedy Death", 1998)
 Retrace (1996–8) – Dirk French (all episodes)
 Taggart – Derek Halliday ("Out of Bounds", 1998)
 Hetty Wainthropp Investigates – Harry Sholton ("Helping Hansi", 1998)
 Get Well Soon – The Padre (5 episodes, 1997)
 The Heart Surgeon (1997) – Bill Lester
 Woof! – Mr Walters (6 episodes, 1997) / Mr. Ackerman (3 episodes, 1989)
 Poldark (1996) – Duke of Leeds
 My Good Friend – Mr. Moss (Episode #2.1, 1996)
 Silent Witness – Allen Symonds ("Darkness Visible", parts 1 & 2, 1996)
 Is It Legal? – Mr. Arnold ("Dick's House of Horror", 1995)
 Goodnight Sweetheart – George ("Don't Fence Me In", 1995)
 Crown Prosecutor – Colin Molem (Episode #1.8, 1995)
 The Bill – Brian Elliot ("Street Life", 1995)
 The Detectives – Maquess of Tipperary ("Flash", 1995)
 Time Busters – Host (1993–94)
 Sean's Show – Barry Bullsit (8 episodes, 1992–3)
 The New Statesman – Piers Fletcher-Dervish (26 episodes, 1987–92)
 2point4 children – Mr. Barstow ("The Skeleton in the Cupboard", 1992)
 Bunch of Five – Hedley ("Shall We Gather at the River?", 1992)
 Minder – D.C. Melish (7 episodes, 1984–89)
 The Death of a Heart (1987) – Bursely
 Boon – Martin Turnover ("Fiddler Under the Roof", 1987)
 A Dorothy L. Sayers Mystery – P.C. Ormonde ("Have His Carcase", episodes 1–4, 1987)
 God's Chosen Car Park (1986) – Curtis
 My Brother Jonathan – Arthur Martock (4 episodes, 1985) 
 Murder of a Moderate Man – (Episode #1.2, 1985)
 C.A.T.S. Eyes – Detective Inspector ("Love Byte", 1985)
 Morgan's Boy – Vicar (2 episodes, 1984)
 Sorrell and Son – Maurice (3 episodes, 1984)
 Strangers and Brothers – Jack Cotery (2 episodes, 1984)
 Squadron – Flt. Lt. Stather ("Mascot", 1982)
 Take Three Women – Duffy (1982)
 ITV Playhouse – John ("Nightlife", 1982)
 The Barretts of Wimpole Street (1982) – Capt. Surtees Cook
 Bless Me, Father – Father Tom ("Things Are Not What They Seem", 1981)
We, the Accused – (1 episode, 1980)
 Angels – (3 episodes, 1976–80)
 BBC2 Playhouse – (2 episodes, 1978–80)
 Tales of the Unexpected – (2 episodes, 1979–80)
 Armchair Thriller – Police Constable / Police Sergeant ("Dying Day" Parts 1, 2 & 4, 1980)
 Blake's 7 – Pilot Four-Zero ("Children of Auron", 1980)
 Testament of Youth – Victor Richardson (3 episodes, 1979)
 A Moment in Time (1979) – Tom (all episodes)
 The Deep Concern – Gary Haig (2 episodes, 1979)
 The Mill on the Floss – Bob Jakin (Episode Eight, 1979)
 Graham's Gang – ("Kidnap", 1977)
 Backs to the Land – Eric Whitlow (3 episodes, 1977)
 Fathers and Families – Andrew Matthews ("Ancient Scars", 1977)
 Scene – Rob Rose ("Newsworthy: The Girl Who Saw a Tiger", 1976)
 The Expert – Student ("Fail Safe", 1976)
 David Copperfield – Mick Walker (Episode #1.2, 1974)

References

External links
www.michaeltroughton.co.uk

 

1955 births
Living people
20th-century English male actors
21st-century English male actors
Drama teachers
English male television actors
Troughton family
English male radio actors
Alumni of the Open University
Male actors from London
People from Hampstead